"London Calling" is a song by the British punk rock band the Clash. It was released as a single from the band's 1979 double album of the same name. This apocalyptic, politically charged rant features the band's post-punk sound, electric guitar and vocals.

Writing and recording

The song was written by Joe Strummer and Mick Jones. The title alludes to the BBC World Service's station identification: "This is London calling ...", which was used during World War II, often in broadcasts to occupied countries.

The lyrics reflect the concern felt by Strummer about world events with the reference to "a nuclear error" – the incident at Three Mile Island, which occurred earlier in 1979. Joe Strummer has said: "We felt that we were struggling about to slip down a slope or something, grasping with our fingernails. And there was no one there to help us."

The line "London is drowning / And I live by the river" comes from concerns that if the River Thames flooded, most of central London would drown, something that led to the construction of the Thames Barrier. Strummer's concern for police brutality is evident through the lines "We ain't got no swing / Except for the ring of that truncheon thing" as the Metropolitan Police at the time had a truncheon as standard issued equipment.  Social criticism also features through references to the effects of casual drug taking: "We ain't got no high / Except for that one with the yellowy eyes". 

The lyrics also reflect desperation of the band's situation in 1979 struggling with high debt, without management and arguing with their record label over whether the London Calling album should be a single or double album. The lines referring to "Now don't look to us / Phoney Beatlemania has bitten the dust" reflects the concerns of the band over its situation after the punk rock boom in England had ended in 1977. 

According to a retrospective assessment by Allmusic critic Donald A. Guarisco, the song "cleverly crossbreeds anthemic hard rock with reggae by juxtaposing slashing, staccato guitar riffs with an undulating rhythm section beat as Strummer lays down a snarling vocal..."  Guarisco finds that this gives the song "a hypnotic sense of drive."

The song fades out with a Morse code signal spelling S-O-S, reiterating the earlier urgent sense of emergency, and further alluding to drowning in the river.

"London Calling" was recorded at Wessex Studios located in a former church hall in Highbury in North London. This studio had already proved to be a popular location with the Sex Pistols, the Pretenders and the Tom Robinson band. The single was produced by Guy Stevens and engineered by Bill Price.

Personnel

"London Calling"
 Joe Strummer – lead vocals, rhythm guitar
 Mick Jones – backing vocals, lead guitars
 Paul Simonon – backing vocals, bass guitar
 Topper Headon – drums

"Armagideon Time"
 Joe Strummer – lead vocals, piano
 Mick Jones – guitars, harmonica, sound effects
 Paul Simonon – bass guitar
 Topper Headon – drums
 Mickey Gallagher – organ

Artwork
Continuing the theme of the retro Elvis Presley-inspired London Calling LP cover, the single sleeve (front and back) is based on old Columbia 78 rpm sleeves. The cover artwork was designed by Ray Lowry and is identical to the Columbia sleeve but with the blank 78 covers from the original changed to classic rock and punk LP sleeves. From left to right they are, the Beatles' debut Please Please Me, Never Mind the Bollocks, Here's the Sex Pistols, The Rolling Stones debut, The Clashs debut, Bob Dylan's Highway 61 Revisited and the Elvis Presley debut LP.

Reissues
The single has several issues, all with different covers. Four are from 1979 (catalogue number: 8087; S CBS 8087; 128087; S CBS 8087). In 1988, a special limited edition boxed set was released, containing three tracks, "London Calling" on side one, "Brand New Cadillac" and "Rudie Can't Fail" on side two, a poster and two badges (catalogue number: CLASH B2). Two were released by CBS Records in 1991 (catalogue number: 656946; 31-656946-22) both with "Brand New Cadillac" on the B-side, the second one has an additional track on side two "Return to Brixton (Jeremy Healy 7" Remix)" (see the table below).

In 2012, on the occasion of the International Record Store Day, a limited edition 7" was released, with a new mix of the song by Mick Jones, and an instrumental version on the B-side.

Chart success and critical reception
"London Calling" was released as the only single from the album in the UK and reached No. 11 in the charts in January 1980, becoming at once the band's highest-charting single until "Should I Stay or Should I Go" hit No. 1 ten years later. The song did not make the U.S. charts, as "Train in Vain" was released as a single and broke the band in the United States, reaching No. 23 on the pop charts.

BBC Radio One DJ Annie Nightingale made a bet with Strummer that London Calling would make the UK Top 10 without them appearing on Top of the Pops, the stake being a Cadillac ("Brand New Cadillac" being the second track on the London Calling album). When the record peaked at number 11, Nightingale was saved by a listener who donated a Cadillac. The Cadillac was subsequently auctioned to raise funds for the recession-hit steel town of Corby.

"London Calling" was the first Clash song to chart elsewhere in the world, reaching the top 40 in Australia. The success of the single and album was greatly helped by the music video shot by Don Letts showing the band playing the song on a boat (Festival Pier), next to Albert Bridge on the south side of the Thames, Battersea Park in a cold and rainy night at the beginning of December 1979.

The single fell off the charts after 10 weeks, but later re-entered the chart twice, spending a total of 15 non-consecutive weeks on the UK Singles Chart.

Over the years, "London Calling" has become regarded by many critics as the band's finest song. In 2004, Rolling Stone ranked it number 15 in its list of the 500 Greatest Songs of All Time, the highest position for the band and for any punk rock song. In 1989, the magazine also rated the album of the same name as the best album of the 1980s—although it was released in late 1979 in Britain, it came out in January 1980 in the USA. In 2011, Paste ranked the song number two on their list of the 18 greatest songs by the Clash. In 2020, The Guardian ranked the song number five on their list of the 40 greatest songs by the Clash.

"London Calling" was also ranked number 42 on VH1's "100 Greatest Songs of the '80s". It was erroneously listed as being released in 1982, when it was fact released in 1979. It is one of The Rock and Roll Hall of Fame's 500 Songs that Shaped Rock and Roll.

Notable appearances and covers
The Clash turned down a request from British Telecom to use the song for an advertising campaign in the early 1990s. In 2002, the band incurred criticism when they sold the rights to Jaguar for a car advertisement. In an interview posted on his website, Strummer explained the reasons for the deal. "Yeah. I agreed to that. We get hundreds of requests for that and turn 'em all down. But I just thought Jaguar ... yeah. If you're in a group and you make it together, then everybody deserves something. Especially twenty-odd years after the fact."

The song was also used for a 2012 British Airways advertisement, picturing a jet aeroplane taxiing through the streets of London passing numerous landmarks and parking outside the Olympic Stadium.

Joe Strummer later became a DJ for the BBC World Service, on a programme called "Joe Strummer's London Calling".

Following the 2022 Russian invasion of Ukraine, the Clash gave permission to a Ukrainian punk band named Beton to rewrite the song as an anti-invasion anthem and charity fund-raiser titled "Kyiv Calling".

Charts

Certifications

Sources

Notes

External links
"Anatomy of a Song" by The Wall Street Journal

1979 singles
The Clash songs
Protest songs
Songs about London
Songs about floods
Songs about rivers
Songs written by Mick Jones (The Clash)
Songs written by Joe Strummer
Song recordings produced by Guy Stevens
1979 songs
CBS Records singles